Fresh from the Farm is a 1915 American short comedy film starring Harold Lloyd.

Plot
A farm youth goes to college, pursues the pretty co-eds and joins a fraternity.

Cast
 Harold Lloyd as Lonesome Luke
 Gene Marsh
 Elsie Greeson
 Jack Spinks
 Arthur Harrison

See also
 Harold Lloyd filmography
List of films of 1915

References

External links

1915 films
1915 comedy films
Silent American comedy films
American black-and-white films
1915 short films
American silent short films
Films directed by Hal Roach
Lonesome Luke films
American comedy short films
1910s American films